Vidhu Prathap (born 1 September 1980) is an Indian playback singer. He has sung many songs in over 600 films in  Malayalam, Tamil, Kannada and Telugu languages.

Career

Early life
Vidhu Prathap was born in 1980 in Kaithamukku in Trivandrum, Kerala, as the son of Prathapan and Laila. He did his early education from Holy Angel's Convent Trivandrum and then completed his schooling at Christ Nagar School, Thiruvananthapuram. During his school days in Christ Nagar, he used to participate in mono-acts and mimicry and had a real penchant for singing. Vidhu was the college union Arts Club Secretary in Mar Ivanios college, Thiruvananthapuram, where he did his graduation. In 1997–98, at the age of 17, he won the 'Voice of the Year Award' in a music competition conducted by Asianet, a leading private channel. It was after this that he seriously thought about becoming a singer. Vidhu started taking music lessons when he was three years old and has won many competitions in several musical categories.

Playback singing
He first sang for a movie called Paadamudra, when he was in class IV. But his real break was in 1999 in a movie Devadasi rendering 'Pon Vasantham', a difficult song with a classical touch.

His rendering of the fast number Shukriya Shukriya in Niram (1999) made him popular. Besides, with a generation shift in Malayalam cinema, younger actors like Dileep, Kunchacko Boban and Prithviraj Sukumaran needed a young voice to suit their style, where Vidhu was fitted in. His depth and range were once again evident in the movie Sayahnam, directed by R. Sarath, which won Vidhu the Kerala State Film Award for Best Singer in 2000 for the song Kaalame Kaikolluka Nee. His rendition of Mohan Sithara's Sukhamani Nilaavu from the movie Nammal won him the Asianet Best Male playback singer award in 2002. The credit for his 'mood rendition' should go to music director G. Devarajan, with whom he trained for four years. He has also trained under composer Perumbavoor G. Raveendranath.

Ilaiyaraaja introduced him in Tamil in the movie Solla Marandha Kadhai (2002). Later he sang many Tamil songs, most of them became hits. In 2003, he got another hit song Vaaleduthal Ankakali from Meesa Madhavan. He also sang a song for the Malayalam musical album Chempakame, the song Melemaanathu got many positive reviews from critics. Some movies that featured songs by him are 'Meesa Madhavan', 'Nammal', 'Swapnakoodu', 'Pattalam', 'Runway', 'Pandippada', 'Ravanan', 'Vargam', 'Out of Syllabus', 'Chathikkatha Chanthu', 'Thanmathra', 'Vasthavam', 'Kadha', 'Kangaroo (2007 film)', 'In Ghost House Inn', 'Lollipop', 'Kerala Varma Pazhassi Raja', 'Oru Naal Varum', 'Violin', and '180'. He has sung the most songs for music director Alex Paul. He has completed songs in over a 150 movies, and hundreds of music albums. Vidhu is also an active performer in many stage shows in India as well as abroad.

Other Works
He also tried his hands at acting for a time. He starred in a serial directed by the yester-years musician-lyricist-director Sreekumaran Thampi. It is called 'Paattukalude Paattu', and the story revolves around a struggling but upcoming stage singer.
He has hosted shows like Idea Star Singer 2006 and Surya Challenge. He has judged Top Singer on Flowers TV and is now a judge of Super 4 (Indian TV series) on Mazhavil Manorama.

Personal life

He married Deepthi Prasad, a TV anchor and a professional classical dancer on 20 August 2008.

Awards

He has several awards to his credit, most important being the first Asianet Voice of the Year Award (1997), Kerala State Film Award for Best Singer for the song 'Kaalame Kaikolluka Nee' from Sayahnam (2001), Asianet Best Male Singer Award for 'Sukhamani Nilaavu' from Nammal (2002), Sathyan Foundations Award, GMMA Award, Krystal Symphony TV Young Achiever's Award, and Film Critics Award (2012).

TV shows

Notes and references

External links
 
 Blog of Vidhu Prathap

1980 births
Living people
Singers from Thiruvananthapuram
Malayalam playback singers
Indian male playback singers
Tamil playback singers
Malayali people
Film musicians from Kerala
Kerala State Film Award winners
21st-century Indian singers
21st-century Indian male singers